The Swiss Laboratory for Doping Analyses (French: Laboratoire suisse d'analyse du dopage, LAD) is the only anti-doping laboratory in Switzerland.

It is affiliated to the University Hospital of Lausanne and is located in Épalinges (urban area of Lausanne).

History 

The Swiss Laboratory for Doping Analyses was founded in 1990 and accredited by the International Olympic Committee in 1991.

It is also accredited by the World Anti-Doping Agency.

Mission 

The Swiss Laboratory for Doping Analyses is the testing laboratory for many international sport competitions such as the Tour de France (since 1997), the UEFA Euro 2008 and the 2014 FIFA World Cup.

Notes and references

See also 
 Biological passport

External links 
 

Anti-doping organizations
Laboratories in Switzerland
Research institutes in Switzerland
1990 establishments in Switzerland